Aeolochroma prasina is a moth of the family Geometridae first described by William Warren in 1896. It is found on New Guinea and Seram.

Subspecies
Aeolochroma prasina prasina (Fergusson Island)
Aeolochroma prasina angustifascia Prout, 1916 (Dampier Island)
Aeolochroma prasina defasciata Prout, 1916 (New Britain)
Aeolochroma prasina louisa Prout, 1927 (St. Aignan Island)
Aeolochroma prasina spadiocampa Prout, 1917 (Biak)

References

Moths described in 1896
Pseudoterpnini
Moths of Indonesia
Moths of New Guinea